The Charles Town Classic is a Grade II American Thoroughbred horse race for horses aged three years old and older over a distance of one and one-eighth miles on the dirt held annually in August at Hollywood Casino at Charles Town Races in Charles Town, West Virginia.  The event currently carries a purse of $1,000,000.

History

The event was inaugurated on 18 April 2009 and was won by the second favorite (16/5) Researcher who after taking the lead shortly before entering the stretch run, drawing off to win by a  margin in a time of 1:49.86. In 2009 the stakes distribution was as follows: If the winner had previously won a Grade 1 Stakes Race, then the purse was $1,000,000.  If the winner had previously won a Grade 2 Stakes Race, then the purse was $750,000.  If the winner had previously won a Grade 3 Stakes Race, then the purse was $600,000.  If the winner had never before won a Graded Stakes Race, then the purse was $500,000. The official purse was $615,000. Researcher won the event again the following year. However, Researcher was owned by a new owner, Kinross (Zohar Ben-Dov), only five days before the Classic. He was previously owned by Rutledge Farm, which was owned by the late Hermen Greenberg who had died earlier in the year in February.

With the increased high stakes attributed to the racino the event immediately as  attractive for four year old horses and older in the early spring.

In 2011 the event was upgraded by the Thoroughbred Owners and Breeders Association to Grade 3 status. The following year the event was upgraded once more to Grade 2.

Charles Town Track Officials announced a new purse layout for the 2015 running of this race in order to attract the brightest stars in racing. This means that if the winner of the Classic has also won prestigious races there is $500,000 set aside from the purse for their Classic success. For the 2015 highly talented Shared Belief was shipped in from California and set as the 3-10 odds-on favorite but stumbled badly and was eased by his jockey Mike E. Smith. Moreno, the third favorite went on to win the event and set a new track record in 1:48:81.

Charles Town Track officials announced in December 2015 that the purse for the 2016 running of the Charles Town Classic would be reduced to $1,250,000.

In 2020 due to the COVID-19 pandemic in the United States the event was moved to an August schedule and the conditions were changed to allow three-year-olds to participate.

Records
Speed Record:
1:48.81 – Moreno (2015) 

Margins:
 lengths – Sleepy Eyes Todd (2020)

Most Wins:
2  –  Researcher (2009, 2010)
2  –  Imperative (2014, 2017)
2  –  Art Collector (2021, 2022)

Most wins by a jockey:
3  –  Javier Castellano (2012, 2016, 2017)

Most wins by a trainer:
2  –  Jeff C. Runco (2009, 2010)
2  –  Todd A. Pletcher (2012, 2016)
2  –  William I. Mott (2021, 2022)

Most wins by an owner:
2  –  Bruce Lunsford (2021, 2022)

Winners

See also
List of American and Canadian Graded races

References

Videos
 Charles Town Classic Video, Charles Town – April 16, 2011
 Charles Town Classic Video, Charles Town – April 17, 2010
 Charles Town Classic Video, Charles Town – April 18, 2009

Graded stakes races in the United States
Grade 2 stakes races in the United States
Open mile category horse races
Horse races in the United States
Recurring sporting events established in 2009
2009 establishments in West Virginia
Jefferson County, West Virginia